State Route 249 (SR 249) is a  route in the United States that serves as a connection between Alabama's SR 27 in Ozark with Fort Rucker.

Route description
SR 249 begins at the eastern gate of Fort Rucker southwest of Ozark in Dale County, heading northeast on four-lane undivided Andrews Avenue. The route runs along the border between Fort Rucker to the west and Ozark to the east, passing through wooded areas with some fields, homes, and businesses, intersecting CR 21 and CR 34. The road fully enters Ozark and runs through woodland with some residences, intersecting CR 101 before coming to a junction with US 231/SR 53 in a commercial area. Past this, SR 249 becomes a five-lane road with a center left-turn lane that passes more businesses before coming to its northern terminus at SR 27, where Andrews Avenue continues northeast as part of that route.

Major intersections

References

249
Transportation in Dale County, Alabama